Vittore Capello, C.R.S. (1588–1648) was a Roman Catholic prelate who served as Titular Bishop of Famagusta (1633–1648).

Biography
Vittore Capello was born in 1588 in Venice, Italy and ordained a priest in the Ordo Clericorum Regularium a Somascha.
On 20 Jun 1633, he was appointed during the papacy of Pope Urban VIII as Titular Bishop of Famagusta.
On 31 Jul 1633, he was consecrated bishop by Bernardino Spada, Cardinal-Priest of Santo Stefano al Monte Celio, with Ettore Diotallevi, Bishop of Sant'Agata de' Goti, and Alessandro Filonardi, Bishop of Aquino, serving as co-consecrators. 
He remained as Titular Bishop of Famagusta until his death in 1648.

References 

17th-century Roman Catholic titular bishops
Bishops appointed by Pope Urban VIII
1588 births
1648 deaths